Methamphetamine (contracted from ) is a potent central nervous system (CNS) stimulant that is mainly used as a recreational drug and less commonly as a second-line treatment for attention deficit hyperactivity disorder and obesity. Methamphetamine was discovered in 1893 and exists as two enantiomers: levo-methamphetamine and dextro-methamphetamine. Methamphetamine properly refers to a specific chemical substance, the racemic free base, which is an equal mixture of levomethamphetamine and dextromethamphetamine in their pure amine forms. It is rarely prescribed over concerns involving human neurotoxicity and potential for recreational use as an aphrodisiac and euphoriant, among other concerns, as well as the availability of safer substitute drugs with comparable treatment efficacy such as Adderall and Vyvanse. Dextroamphetamine is a stronger CNS stimulant than levomethamphetamine.

Both racemic methamphetamine and dextromethamphetamine are illicitly trafficked and sold owing to their potential for recreational use. The highest prevalence of illegal methamphetamine use occurs in parts of Asia and Oceania, and in the United States, where racemic methamphetamine and dextromethamphetamine are classified as schedule II controlled substances. Levomethamphetamine is available as an over-the-counter (OTC) drug for use as an inhaled nasal decongestant in the United States. Internationally, the production, distribution, sale, and possession of methamphetamine is restricted or banned in many countries, owing to its placement in schedule II of the United Nations Convention on Psychotropic Substances treaty. While dextromethamphetamine is a more potent drug, racemic methamphetamine is illicitly produced more often, owing to the relative ease of synthesis and regulatory limits of chemical precursor availability.

In low to moderate doses, methamphetamine can elevate mood, increase alertness, concentration and energy in fatigued individuals, reduce appetite, and promote weight loss. At very high doses, it can induce psychosis, breakdown of skeletal muscle, seizures and bleeding in the brain. Chronic high-dose use can precipitate unpredictable and rapid mood swings, stimulant psychosis (e.g., paranoia, hallucinations, delirium, and delusions) and violent behavior. Recreationally, methamphetamine's ability to increase energy has been reported to lift mood and increase sexual desire to such an extent that users are able to engage in sexual activity continuously for several days while binging the drug. Methamphetamine is known to possess a high addiction liability (i.e., a high likelihood that long-term or high dose use will lead to compulsive drug use) and high dependence liability (i.e. a high likelihood that withdrawal symptoms will occur when methamphetamine use ceases). Withdrawal from methamphetamine after heavy use may lead to a post-acute-withdrawal syndrome, which can persist for months beyond the typical withdrawal period. Methamphetamine is neurotoxic to human midbrain dopaminergic neurons at high doses. Methamphetamine has been shown to have a higher affinity and, as a result, higher toxicity toward serotonergic neurons than amphetamine. Methamphetamine neurotoxicity causes adverse changes in brain structure and function, such as reductions in grey matter volume in several brain regions, as well as adverse changes in markers of metabolic integrity.

Methamphetamine belongs to the substituted phenethylamine and substituted amphetamine chemical classes. It is related to the other dimethylphenethylamines as a positional isomer of these compounds, which share the common chemical formula .

Uses

Medical 

In the United States, methamphetamine hydrochloride, under the trade name Desoxyn, has been approved by the FDA for treating ADHD and obesity in both adults and children; however, the FDA also indicates that the limited therapeutic usefulness of methamphetamine should be weighed against the inherent risks associated with its use. Methamphetamine is sometimes prescribed off label for narcolepsy and idiopathic hypersomnia. In the United States, methamphetamine's levorotary form is available in some over-the-counter (OTC) nasal decongestant products.

As methamphetamine is associated with a high potential for misuse, the drug is regulated under the Controlled Substances Act and is listed under Schedule II in the United States. Methamphetamine hydrochloride dispensed in the United States is required to include a boxed warning regarding its potential for recreational misuse and addiction liability.

Desoxyn and Desoxyn Gradumet are both pharmaceutical forms of the drug. The latter is no longer produced and is a gradual-release form of the drug, flattening the curve of the effect of the drug while extending it.

Recreational 

Methamphetamine is often used recreationally for its effects as a potent euphoriant and stimulant as well as aphrodisiac qualities.

According to a National Geographic TV documentary on methamphetamine, an entire subculture known as party and play is based around sexual activity and methamphetamine use. Participants in this subculture, which consists almost entirely of homosexual male methamphetamine users, will typically meet up through internet dating sites and have sex. Because of its strong stimulant and aphrodisiac effects and inhibitory effect on ejaculation, with repeated use, these sexual encounters will sometimes occur continuously for several days on end. The crash following the use of methamphetamine in this manner is very often severe, with marked hypersomnia (excessive daytime sleepiness). The party and play subculture is prevalent in major US cities such as San Francisco and New York City.

Contraindications 
Methamphetamine is contraindicated in individuals with a history of substance use disorder, heart disease, or severe agitation or anxiety, or in individuals currently experiencing arteriosclerosis, glaucoma, hyperthyroidism, or severe hypertension. The FDA states that individuals who have experienced hypersensitivity reactions to other stimulants in the past or are currently taking monoamine oxidase inhibitors should not take methamphetamine. The FDA also advises individuals with bipolar disorder, depression, elevated blood pressure, liver or kidney problems, mania, psychosis, Raynaud's phenomenon, seizures, thyroid problems, tics, or Tourette syndrome to monitor their symptoms while taking methamphetamine. Owing to the potential for stunted growth, the FDA advises monitoring the height and weight of growing children and adolescents during treatment.

Adverse effects

Physical 
The physical effects of methamphetamine can include loss of appetite, hyperactivity, dilated pupils, flushed skin, excessive sweating, increased movement, dry mouth and teeth grinding (leading to "meth mouth"), headache, irregular heartbeat (usually as accelerated heartbeat or slowed heartbeat), rapid breathing, high blood pressure, low blood pressure, high body temperature, diarrhea, constipation, blurred vision, dizziness, twitching, numbness, tremors, dry skin, acne, and pale appearance. Long-term meth users may have sores on their skin; these may be caused by scratching due to itchiness or the belief that insects are crawling under their skin, and the damage is compounded by poor diet and hygiene. Numerous deaths related to methamphetamine overdoses have been reported.

Meth mouth 

Methamphetamine users and addicts may lose their teeth abnormally quickly, regardless of the route of administration, from a condition informally known as meth mouth. The condition is generally most severe in users who inject the drug, rather than swallow, smoke, or inhale it. According to the American Dental Association, meth mouth "is probably caused by a combination of drug-induced psychological and physiological changes resulting in xerostomia (dry mouth), extended periods of poor oral hygiene, frequent consumption of high-calorie, carbonated beverages and bruxism (teeth grinding and clenching)". As dry mouth is also a common side effect of other stimulants, which are not known to contribute severe tooth decay, many researchers suggest that methamphetamine-associated tooth decay is more due to users' other choices. They suggest the side effect has been exaggerated and stylized to create a stereotype of current users as a deterrence for new ones.

Sexually transmitted infection 
Methamphetamine use was found to be related to higher frequencies of unprotected sexual intercourse in both HIV-positive and unknown casual partners, an association more pronounced in HIV-positive participants. These findings suggest that methamphetamine use and engagement in unprotected anal intercourse are co-occurring risk behaviors, behaviors that potentially heighten the risk of HIV transmission among gay and bisexual men. Methamphetamine use allows users of both sexes to engage in prolonged sexual activity, which may cause genital sores and abrasions as well as priapism in men. Methamphetamine may also cause sores and abrasions in the mouth via bruxism, increasing the risk of sexually transmitted infection.

Besides the sexual transmission of HIV, it may also be transmitted between users who share a common needle. The level of needle sharing among methamphetamine users is similar to that among other drug injection users.

Fatal
Doses of 200 mg or more of methamphetamine are considered fatal.

Psychological 
The psychological effects of methamphetamine can include euphoria, dysphoria, changes in libido, alertness, apprehension and concentration, decreased sense of fatigue, insomnia or wakefulness, self-confidence, sociability, irritability, restlessness, grandiosity and repetitive and obsessive behaviors. Peculiar to methamphetamine and related stimulants is "punding", persistent non-goal-directed repetitive activity. Methamphetamine use also has a high association with anxiety, depression, amphetamine psychosis, suicide, and violent behaviors.

Neurotoxic and neuroimmunological 

Methamphetamine is directly neurotoxic to dopaminergic neurons in both lab animals and humans. Excitotoxicity, oxidative stress, metabolic compromise, UPS dysfunction, protein nitration, endoplasmic reticulum stress, p53 expression and other processes contributed to this neurotoxicity. In line with its dopaminergic neurotoxicity, methamphetamine use is associated with a higher risk of Parkinson's disease. In addition to its dopaminergic neurotoxicity, a review of evidence in humans indicated that high-dose methamphetamine use can also be neurotoxic to serotonergic neurons. It has been demonstrated that a high core temperature is correlated with an increase in the neurotoxic effects of methamphetamine. Withdrawal of methamphetamine in dependent persons may lead to post-acute withdrawal which persists months beyond the typical withdrawal period.

Magnetic resonance imaging studies on human methamphetamine users have also found evidence of neurodegeneration, or adverse neuroplastic changes in brain structure and function. In particular, methamphetamine appears to cause hyperintensity and hypertrophy of white matter, marked shrinkage of hippocampi, and reduced gray matter in the cingulate cortex, limbic cortex, and paralimbic cortex in recreational methamphetamine users. Moreover, evidence suggests that adverse changes in the level of biomarkers of metabolic integrity and synthesis occur in recreational users, such as a reduction in N-acetylaspartate and creatine levels and elevated levels of choline and myoinositol.

Methamphetamine has been shown to activate TAAR1 in human astrocytes and generate cAMP as a result. Activation of astrocyte-localized TAAR1 appears to function as a mechanism by which methamphetamine attenuates membrane-bound EAAT2 (SLC1A2) levels and function in these cells.

Methamphetamine binds to and activates both sigma receptor subtypes, σ1 and σ2, with micromolar affinity. Sigma receptor activation may promote methamphetamine-induced neurotoxicity by facilitating hyperthermia, increasing dopamine synthesis and release, influencing microglial activation, and modulating apoptotic signaling cascades and the formation of reactive oxygen species.

Addictive 

Current models of addiction from chronic drug use involve alterations in gene expression in certain parts of the brain, particularly the nucleus accumbens. The most important transcription factors that produce these alterations are ΔFosB, cAMP response element binding protein (CREB), and nuclear factor kappa B (NFκB). ΔFosB plays a crucial role in the development of drug addictions, since its overexpression in D1-type medium spiny neurons in the nucleus accumbens is necessary and sufficient for most of the behavioral and neural adaptations that arise from addiction. Once ΔFosB is sufficiently overexpressed, it induces an addictive state that becomes increasingly more severe with further increases in ΔFosB expression. It has been implicated in addictions to alcohol, cannabinoids, cocaine, methylphenidate, nicotine, opioids, phencyclidine, propofol, and substituted amphetamines, among others.

ΔJunD, a transcription factor, and G9a, a histone methyltransferase enzyme, both directly oppose the induction of ΔFosB in the nucleus accumbens (i.e., they oppose increases in its expression). Sufficiently overexpressing ΔJunD in the nucleus accumbens with viral vectors can completely block many of the neural and behavioral alterations seen in chronic drug use (i.e., the alterations mediated by ΔFosB). ΔFosB also plays an important role in regulating behavioral responses to natural rewards, such as palatable food, sex, and exercise. Since both natural rewards and addictive drugs induce expression of ΔFosB (i.e., they cause the brain to produce more of it), chronic acquisition of these rewards can result in a similar pathological state of addiction. ΔFosB is the most significant factor involved in both amphetamine addiction and amphetamine-induced sex addictions, which are compulsive sexual behaviors that result from excessive sexual activity and amphetamine use. These sex addictions (i.e., drug-induced compulsive sexual behaviors) are associated with a dopamine dysregulation syndrome which occurs in some patients taking dopaminergic drugs, such as amphetamine or methamphetamine.

Epigenetic factors
Methamphetamine addiction is persistent for many individuals, with 61% of individuals treated for addiction relapsing within one year. About half of those with methamphetamine addiction continue with use over a ten-year period, while the other half reduce use starting at about one to four years after initial use.

The frequent persistence of addiction suggests that long-lasting changes in gene expression may occur in particular regions of the brain, and may contribute importantly to the addiction phenotype. In 2014, a crucial role was found for epigenetic mechanisms in driving lasting changes in gene expression in the brain.

A review in 2015 summarized a number of studies involving chronic methamphetamine use in rodents. Epigenetic alterations were observed in the brain reward pathways, including areas like ventral tegmental area, nucleus accumbens, and dorsal striatum, the hippocampus, and the prefrontal cortex. Chronic methamphetamine use caused gene-specific histone acetylations, deacetylations and methylations. Gene-specific DNA methylations in particular regions of the brain were also observed. The various epigenetic alterations caused downregulations or upregulations of specific genes important in addiction. For instance, chronic methamphetamine use caused methylation of the lysine in position 4 of histone 3 located at the promoters of the c-fos and the C-C chemokine receptor 2 (ccr2) genes, activating those genes in the nucleus accumbens (NAc). c-fos is well known to be important in addiction. The ccr2 gene is also important in addiction, since mutational inactivation of this gene impairs addiction.

In methamphetamine addicted rats, epigenetic regulation through reduced acetylation of histones, in brain striatal neurons, caused reduced transcription of glutamate receptors. Glutamate receptors play an important role in regulating the reinforcing effects of misused illicit drugs.

Administration of methamphetamine to rodents causes DNA damage in their brain, particularly in the nucleus accumbens region. During repair of such DNA damages, persistent chromatin alterations may occur such as in the methylation of DNA or the acetylation or methylation of histones at the sites of repair. These alterations can be epigenetic scars in the chromatin that contribute to the persistent epigenetic changes found in methamphetamine addiction.

Treatment and management 

A 2018 systematic review and network meta-analysis of 50 trials involving 12 different psychosocial interventions for amphetamine, methamphetamine, or cocaine addiction found that combination therapy with both contingency management and community reinforcement approach had the highest efficacy (i.e., abstinence rate) and acceptability (i.e., lowest dropout rate). Other treatment modalities examined in the analysis included monotherapy with contingency management or community reinforcement approach, cognitive behavioral therapy, 12-step programs, non-contingent reward-based therapies, psychodynamic therapy, and other combination therapies involving these.

, there is no effective pharmacotherapy for methamphetamine addiction. A systematic review and meta-analysis from 2019 assessed the efficacy of 17 different pharmacotherapies used in RCTs for amphetamine and methamphetamine addiction; it found only low-strength evidence that methylphenidate might reduce amphetamine or methamphetamine self-administration. There was low- to moderate-strength evidence of no benefit for most of the other medications used in RCTs, which included antidepressants (bupropion, mirtazapine, sertraline), antipsychotics (aripiprazole), anticonvulsants (topiramate, baclofen, gabapentin), naltrexone, varenicline, citicoline, ondansetron, prometa, riluzole, atomoxetine, dextroamphetamine, and modafinil.

Dependence and withdrawal 
Tolerance is expected to develop with regular methamphetamine use and, when used recreationally, this tolerance develops rapidly. In dependent users, withdrawal symptoms are positively correlated with the level of drug tolerance. Depression from methamphetamine withdrawal lasts longer and is more severe than that of cocaine withdrawal.

According to the current Cochrane review on drug dependence and withdrawal in recreational users of methamphetamine, "when chronic heavy users abruptly discontinue [methamphetamine] use, many report a time-limited withdrawal syndrome that occurs within 24 hours of their last dose". Withdrawal symptoms in chronic, high-dose users are frequent, occurring in up to 87.6% of cases, and persist for three to four weeks with a marked "crash" phase occurring during the first week. Methamphetamine withdrawal symptoms can include anxiety, drug craving, dysphoric mood, fatigue, increased appetite, increased movement or decreased movement, lack of motivation, sleeplessness or sleepiness, and vivid or lucid dreams.

Methamphetamine that is present in a mother's bloodstream can pass through the placenta to a fetus and be secreted into breast milk. Infants born to methamphetamine-abusing mothers may experience a neonatal withdrawal syndrome, with symptoms involving of abnormal sleep patterns, poor feeding, tremors, and hypertonia. This withdrawal syndrome is relatively mild and only requires medical intervention in approximately 4% of cases.

Neonatal
Unlike other drugs, babies with prenatal exposure to methamphetamine do not show immediate signs of withdrawal. Instead, cognitive and behavioral problems start emerging when the children reach school age.

A prospective cohort study of 330 children showed that at the age of 3, children with methamphetamine exposure showed increased emotional reactivity, as well as more signs of anxiety and depression; and at the age of 5, children showed higher rates of externalizing and attention deficit/hyperactivity disorders.

Overdose 
 
A methamphetamine overdose may result in a wide range of symptoms. A moderate overdose of methamphetamine may induce symptoms such as: abnormal heart rhythm, confusion, difficult and/or painful urination, high or low blood pressure, high body temperature, over-active and/or over-responsive reflexes, muscle aches, severe agitation, rapid breathing, tremor, urinary hesitancy, and an inability to pass urine. An extremely large overdose may produce symptoms such as adrenergic storm, methamphetamine psychosis, substantially reduced or no urine output, cardiogenic shock, bleeding in the brain, circulatory collapse, hyperpyrexia (i.e., dangerously high body temperature), pulmonary hypertension, kidney failure, rapid muscle breakdown, serotonin syndrome, and a form of stereotypy ("tweaking"). A methamphetamine overdose will likely also result in mild brain damage owing to dopaminergic and serotonergic neurotoxicity. Death from methamphetamine poisoning is typically preceded by convulsions and coma.

Psychosis 

Use of methamphetamine can result in a stimulant psychosis which may present with a variety of symptoms (e.g., paranoia, hallucinations, delirium, and delusions). A Cochrane Collaboration review on treatment for amphetamine, dextroamphetamine, and methamphetamine use-induced psychosis states that about 5–15% of users fail to recover completely. The same review asserts that, based upon at least one trial, antipsychotic medications effectively resolve the symptoms of acute amphetamine psychosis. Amphetamine psychosis may also develop occasionally as a treatment-emergent side effect.

Emergency treatment 
Acute methamphetamine intoxication is largely managed by treating the symptoms and treatments may initially include administration of activated charcoal and sedation. There is not enough evidence on hemodialysis or peritoneal dialysis in cases of methamphetamine intoxication to determine their usefulness. Forced acid diuresis (e.g., with vitamin C) will increase methamphetamine excretion but is not recommended as it may increase the risk of aggravating acidosis, or cause seizures or rhabdomyolysis. Hypertension presents a risk for intracranial hemorrhage (i.e., bleeding in the brain) and, if severe, is typically treated with intravenous phentolamine or nitroprusside. Blood pressure often drops gradually following sufficient sedation with a benzodiazepine and providing a calming environment.

Antipsychotics such as haloperidol are useful in treating agitation and psychosis from methamphetamine overdose. Beta blockers with lipophilic properties and CNS penetration such as metoprolol and labetalol may be useful for treating CNS and cardiovascular toxicity. The mixed alpha- and beta-blocker labetalol is especially useful for treatment of concomitant tachycardia and hypertension induced by methamphetamine. The phenomenon of "unopposed alpha stimulation" has not been reported with the use of beta-blockers for treatment of methamphetamine toxicity.

Interactions 
Methamphetamine is metabolized by the liver enzyme CYP2D6, so CYP2D6 inhibitors will prolong the elimination half-life of methamphetamine. Methamphetamine also interacts with monoamine oxidase inhibitors (MAOIs), since both MAOIs and methamphetamine increase plasma catecholamines; therefore, concurrent use of both is dangerous. Methamphetamine may decrease the effects of sedatives and depressants and increase the effects of antidepressants and other stimulants as well. Methamphetamine may counteract the effects of antihypertensives and antipsychotics owing to its effects on the cardiovascular system and cognition respectively. The pH of gastrointestinal content and urine affects the absorption and excretion of methamphetamine. Specifically, acidic substances will reduce the absorption of methamphetamine and increase urinary excretion, while alkaline substances do the opposite. Owing to the effect pH has on absorption, proton pump inhibitors, which reduce gastric acid, are known to interact with methamphetamine.

Pharmacology

Pharmacodynamics 
Methamphetamine has been identified as a potent full agonist of trace amine-associated receptor 1 (TAAR1), a G protein-coupled receptor (GPCR) that regulates brain catecholamine systems. Activation of TAAR1 increases cyclic adenosine monophosphate (cAMP) production and either completely inhibits or reverses the transport direction of the dopamine transporter (DAT), norepinephrine transporter (NET), and serotonin transporter (SERT). When methamphetamine binds to TAAR1, it triggers transporter phosphorylation via protein kinase A (PKA) and protein kinase C (PKC) signaling, ultimately resulting in the internalization or reverse function of monoamine transporters. Methamphetamine is also known to increase intracellular calcium, an effect which is associated with DAT phosphorylation through a Ca2+/calmodulin-dependent protein kinase (CAMK)-dependent signaling pathway, in turn producing dopamine efflux. TAAR1 has been shown to reduce the firing rate of neurons through direct activation of G protein-coupled inwardly-rectifying potassium channels. TAAR1 activation by methamphetamine in astrocytes appears to negatively modulate the membrane expression and function of EAAT2, a type of glutamate transporter.

In addition to its effect on the plasma membrane monoamine transporters, methamphetamine inhibits synaptic vesicle function by inhibiting VMAT2, which prevents monoamine uptake into the vesicles and promotes their release. This results in the outflow of monoamines from synaptic vesicles into the cytosol (intracellular fluid) of the presynaptic neuron, and their subsequent release into the synaptic cleft by the phosphorylated transporters. Other transporters that methamphetamine is known to inhibit are SLC22A3 and SLC22A5. SLC22A3 is an extraneuronal monoamine transporter that is present in astrocytes, and SLC22A5 is a high-affinity carnitine transporter.

Methamphetamine is also an agonist of the alpha-2 adrenergic receptors and sigma receptors with a greater affinity for σ1 than σ2, and inhibits monoamine oxidase A (MAO-A) and monoamine oxidase B (MAO-B). Sigma receptor activation by methamphetamine may facilitate its central nervous system stimulant effects and promote neurotoxicity within the brain. Dextromethamphetamine is a stronger psychostimulant, but levomethamphetamine has stronger peripheral effects, a longer half-life, and longer perceived effects among addicts. At high doses, both enantiomers of methamphetamine can induce similar stereotypy and methamphetamine psychosis, but levomethamphetamine has shorter psychodynamic effects.

Pharmacokinetics 
The bioavailability of methamphetamine is 67% orally, 79% intranasally, 67 to 90% via inhalation (smoking), and 100% intravenously. Following oral administration, methamphetamine is well-absorbed into the bloodstream, with peak plasma methamphetamine concentrations achieved in approximately 3.13–6.3 hours post ingestion. Methamphetamine is also well absorbed following inhalation and following intranasal administration. Because of the high lipophilicity of methamphetamine, it can readily move through the blood–brain barrier faster than other stimulants, where it is more resistant to degradation by monoamine oxidase. The amphetamine metabolite peaks at 10–24 hours. Methamphetamine is excreted by the kidneys, with the rate of excretion into the urine heavily influenced by urinary pH. When taken orally, 30–54% of the dose is excreted in urine as methamphetamine and 10–23% as amphetamine. Following IV doses, about 45% is excreted as methamphetamine and 7% as amphetamine. The elimination half-life of methamphetamine varies with a range of 5–30hours, however it is on average 9 to 12hours in most studies. The elimination half-life of methamphetamine does not vary by route of administration, but is subject to substantial interindividual variability.

CYP2D6, dopamine β-hydroxylase, flavin-containing monooxygenase 3, butyrate-CoA ligase, and glycine N-acyltransferase are the enzymes known to metabolize methamphetamine or its metabolites in humans. Among these metabolites, the active sympathomimetics are amphetamine, and norephedrine. Methamphetamine is a CYP2D6 inhibitor.

The main metabolic pathways involve aromatic para-hydroxylation, aliphatic alpha- and beta-hydroxylation, N-oxidation, N-dealkylation, and deamination. The known metabolic pathways include:

Detection in biological fluids 
Methamphetamine and amphetamine are often measured in urine or blood as part of a drug test for sports, employment, poisoning diagnostics, and forensics. Chiral techniques may be employed to help distinguish the source of the drug to determine whether it was obtained illicitly or legally via prescription or prodrug. Chiral separation is needed to assess the possible contribution of levomethamphetamine, which is an active ingredients in some OTC nasal decongestants, toward a positive test result. Dietary zinc supplements can mask the presence of methamphetamine and other drugs in urine.

Chemistry 

Methamphetamine is a chiral compound with two enantiomers, dextromethamphetamine and levomethamphetamine. At room temperature, the free base of methamphetamine is a clear and colorless liquid with an odor characteristic of geranium leaves. It is soluble in diethyl ether and ethanol as well as miscible with chloroform.

In contrast, the methamphetamine hydrochloride salt is odorless with a bitter taste. The hydrochloride salt is also freely soluble in ethanol and water.

Degradation 
A 2011 study into the destruction of methamphetamine using bleach showed that effectiveness is correlated with exposure time and concentration. A year-long study (also from 2011) showed that methamphetamine in soils is a persistent pollutant. In a 2013 study of bioreactors in wastewater, methamphetamine was found to be largely degraded within 30 days under exposure to light.

Synthesis 

Racemic methamphetamine may be prepared starting from phenylacetone by either the Leuckart or reductive amination methods. The intermediate formyl amide is then hydrolyzed under acidic aqueous conditions to yield methamphetamine as the final product. Alternatively, phenylacetone can be reacted with methylamine under reducing conditions to yield methamphetamine.

History, society, and culture 

Amphetamine, discovered before methamphetamine, was first synthesized in 1887 in Germany by Romanian chemist Lazăr Edeleanu who named it phenylisopropylamine. Shortly after, methamphetamine was synthesized from ephedrine in 1893 by Japanese chemist Nagai Nagayoshi. Three decades later, in 1919, methamphetamine hydrochloride was synthesized by pharmacologist Akira Ogata via reduction of ephedrine using red phosphorus and iodine.

Since 1938, methamphetamine was marketed on a large scale in Germany as a nonprescription drug under the brand name Pervitin, produced by the Berlin-based Temmler pharmaceutical company. It was used by all branches of the combined armed forces of the Third Reich, for its stimulant effects and to induce extended wakefulness. Pervitin became colloquially known among the German troops as "Stuka-Tablets" (Stuka-Tabletten) and "Herman-Göring-Pills" (Hermann-Göring-Pillen), as a snide allusion to Göring's widely-known addiction to drugs. However, the side effects, particularly the withdrawal symptoms, were so serious that the army sharply cut back its usage in 1940. By 1941, usage was restricted to a doctor's prescription, and the military tightly controlled its distribution. Soldiers would only receive a couple of tablets at a time, and were discouraged from using them in combat. Historian Łukasz Kamieński says,  Some soldiers turned violent, committing war crimes against civilians; others attacked their own officers.

At the end of the war, it was used as part of a new drug: D-IX.

Obetrol, patented by Obetrol Pharmaceuticals in the 1950s and indicated for treatment of obesity, was one of the first brands of pharmaceutical methamphetamine products. Because of the psychological and stimulant effects of methamphetamine, Obetrol became a popular diet pill in America in the 1950s and 1960s. Eventually, as the addictive properties of the drug became known, governments began to strictly regulate the production and distribution of methamphetamine. For example, during the early 1970s in the United States, methamphetamine became a schedule II controlled substance under the Controlled Substances Act. Currently, methamphetamine is sold under the trade name Desoxyn, trademarked by the Danish pharmaceutical company Lundbeck. As of January 2013, the Desoxyn trademark had been sold to Italian pharmaceutical company Recordati.

Trafficking 
The Golden Triangle (Southeast Asia), specifically Shan State, Myanmar, is the world's leading producer of methamphetamine as production has shifted to Yaba and crystalline methamphetamine, including for export to the United States and across East and Southeast Asia and the Pacific.

Concerning the accelerating synthetic drug production in the region, the Cantonese Chinese syndicate Sam Gor, also known as The Company, is understood to be the main international crime syndicate responsible for this shift. It is made up of members of five different triads. Sam Gor is primarily involved in drug trafficking, earning at least $8 billion per year. Sam Gor is alleged to control 40% of the Asia-Pacific methamphetamine market, while also trafficking heroin and ketamine. The organization is active in a variety of countries, including Myanmar, Thailand, New Zealand, Australia, Japan, China, and Taiwan. Sam Gor previously produced meth in Southern China and is now believed to manufacture mainly in the Golden Triangle, specifically Shan State, Myanmar, responsible for much of the massive surge of crystal meth in circa 2019. The group is understood to be headed by Tse Chi Lop, a gangster born in Guangzhou, China who also holds a Canadian passport.

Liu Zhaohua was another individual involved in the production and trafficking of methamphetamine until his arrest in 2005. It was estimated over 18 tonnes of methamphetamine were produced under his watch.

Legal status 

The production, distribution, sale, and possession of methamphetamine is restricted or illegal in many jurisdictions. Methamphetamine has been placed in schedule II of the United Nations Convention on Psychotropic Substances treaty.

Research 
It has been suggested, based on animal research, that calcitriol, the active metabolite of vitamin D, can provide significant protection against the DA- and 5-HT-depleting effects of neurotoxic doses of methamphetamine.

See also 
18-MC
 Breaking Bad, a TV drama series centered on illicit methamphetamine synthesis
 Drug checking
 Faces of Meth, a drug prevention project
 Harm reduction
 Methamphetamine in Australia
 Methamphetamine in Bangladesh
 Methamphetamine in the Philippines
 Methamphetamine in the United States
 Montana Meth Project, a Montana-based organization aiming to reduce meth use among teenagers
 Recreational drug use
 Rolling meth lab, a transportable laboratory that is used to illegally produce methamphetamine
 Ya ba, Southeast Asian tablets containing a mixture of methamphetamine and caffeine

Explanatory notes 

Image legend

Reference notes

References

Further reading

External links 

 Methamphetamine Toxnet entry
 Methamphetamine Poison Information Monograph
 Drug Trafficking: Aryan Brotherhood Methamphetamine Operation Dismantled, FBI
 Neurologic manifestations of chronic methamphetamine abuse

 
1893 introductions
Anorectics
Aphrodisiacs
Attention deficit hyperactivity disorder management
Carbonic anhydrase activators
Cardiac stimulants
Euphoriants
Excitatory amino acid reuptake inhibitors
Japanese inventions
Management of obesity
Norepinephrine-dopamine releasing agents
Phenethylamines
Sigma agonists
Stimulants
Substituted amphetamines
Sympathomimetics
TAAR1 agonists
VMAT inhibitors